Homayoun Ershadi (also spelled Homayon Ershadi, ; born March 26, 1947) is an Iranian actor, known for his debut role in Taste of Cherry (1997), and several Iranian and other films since then, including Hollywood movies The Kite Runner and Zero Dark Thirty.

Biography 
Ershadi studied architecture in Italy, graduating in 1970 and worked as an architect for many years. 

He was discovered as an actor by acclaimed Iranian New Wave film director, Abbas Kiarostami. While Ershadi was sitting in his car in traffic in Tehran he was approached by Kiarostami and eventually chosen to play the leading role in the film, Taste of Cherry. 

In 2007 he was cast in The Kite Runner, a film about two young boys growing up in Afghanistan.

Awards 
Ershadi won the Sepanta Awards in 2017 for "Best Actor for Short Film" for his work in Blue Lantern, from the 10th Annual Iranian Film Festival in San Francisco, California, US.

Cultural reference
The short story Seeing Ershadi by Nicole Krauss was published in The New Yorker on 5 March 2018. It is about a ballet dancer who watches a film featuring Ershadi and then becomes obsessed with his face.

Filmography

References

External links

1947 births
Iranian male television actors
Iranian male film actors
Living people
Actors from Isfahan
20th-century Iranian male actors
21st-century Iranian male actors